is a Quasi-National Park in Fukushima Prefecture and Niigata Prefecture, Japan.

See also

 List of national parks of Japan

References

Parks and gardens in Niigata Prefecture
Parks and gardens in Fukushima Prefecture
National parks of Japan